Saints Peter and Paul Church in the town of Iwye, Belarus, is a Brick Gothic church, partly altered in Baroque fashion. It is currently an active Roman Catholic church belonging to the Diocese of Grodno. It is included in the list of protected historical and cultural heritage of Belarus.

Built in 1491–1495, in the 16th century the church became Protestant and then, in the 17th century, Catholic again. For a long time a Franciscan monastery existed near the church.

Baroque church buildings in Belarus
Gothic architecture in Belarus
Iwye